Red Lake is located by Bartletts Corner, New York. The outlet flows into the Indian River. Fish species present in the lake are largemouth bass, smallmouth bass, northern pike, pickerel, walleye, yellow perch, channel catfish, rock bass, bluegill, and black crappie. There is a state owned beach launch on Red Lake Road.

References 

Lakes of Jefferson County, New York